Bolli is both a given name and a surname. Notable people with the name include:

Bolli Þorleiksson, key historical character in the Medieval Icelandic Laxdœla saga
Bolli Bollason, his son and character in the same saga
Justin Bolli, American professional golfer
Hans Bolli, Swiss bobsledder
 Nathaniel Bolli MD, American anesthesiologist

See also
Bollinger